Sandeep Ramachandran (born 13 January 1997 in Bahrain) is an Indian professional squash player. As of January 2022, he was ranked number 165 in the world.

References

1997 births
Living people
Indian male squash players
20th-century Indian people
21st-century Indian people